'Dougherty' was an Australian cultivar of domesticated apple, which was grown mainly for export to the United Kingdom, from which a red colored mutation is marketed today as 'Red Dougherty'. 'Dougherty' produces medium-sized fruits at late season, skin background is greenish-yellow and flushed with some red. Flesh is yellowish with sweet flavour.

'Red Dougherty' was discovered around 1930 in Twyford, New Zealand and soon got very popular because of its attractive colour. It has a good resistance to many diseases and ripens at late season. Fruit is small to medium-sized, slightly ribbed, coloured dull red with some russeting. Flesh is firm and fine textured, greenish white, spicy and very sweet.

'Red Doughtery' is an ancestor of the 'Splendour' apple.

References

Apple cultivars